Italy have participated three times at the FIFA Women's World Cup: in the inaugural edition of 1991, in 1999 and in 2019.

While the men's senior team have won the FIFA World Cup four times, the women's team is yet to win a single edition. Italy participated in the inaugural World Cup of 1991 where, after two wins and a loss in the group stage, they qualified for the quarter-finals, where they lost against Norway. After having failed to qualify for the second edition, Italy played in the 1999 edition where they did not go past the group stages. For the following four editions, between 2003 and 2015, Italy failed to qualify for the World Cup, coming close in 2015 after losing in the final match of qualification to the Netherlands.

In 2019, Italy returned to the World Cup after a 20-year absence. With two wins and a defeat, Italy topped their group and progressed to the round of 16, where they beat China 2–0. However, their World Cup journey came to an end as they were defeated 2–0 by the Netherlands in the quarter-finals.

FIFA Women's World Cup record

1991 FIFA Women's World Cup

1999 FIFA Women's World Cup

2019 FIFA Women's World Cup

2023 FIFA Women's World Cup

Overview

Tournaments
 Champions   Runners-up   Third place   Fourth place

Matches

Record by opponent

Goalscorers

References

 
World Cup
Countries at the FIFA Women's World Cup